The men's 10 km sprint competition at the Biathlon World Championships 2023 was held on 11 February 2023.

Results
The race was started at 14:30.

References

Men's sprint